Darhal Malkan Assembly constituency is one of the 87 constituencies in the Jammu and Kashmir Legislative Assembly of Jammu and Kashmir a north state of India. Darhal Malkan is also part of Jammu Lok Sabha constituency.

Member of Legislative Assembly

 1967: Chowdhary Mohmmad Hussain, Indian National Congress
 1972: Mirza Abdul Rashid, Indian National Congress
 1977: Chowdhary Mohmmad Hussain, Jammu & Kashmir National Conference
 1983: Bashir Ahmed, Indian National Congress
 1987: Chowdhary Mohmmad Hussain, Jammu & Kashmir National Conference
 1996: Chowdhary Mohmmad Hussain, Jammu & Kashmir National Conference
 2002: Thakur Puran Singh, Independent
 2008: Chowdhary Zulfkar Ali, Jammu & Kashmir People's Democratic Party

Election results

2014

See also

 Darhal Malkan
 Rajouri district
 List of constituencies of Jammu and Kashmir Legislative Assembly

References

Assembly constituencies of Jammu and Kashmir
Rajouri district